Wibaux County is a county in the U.S. state of Montana. As of the 2020 census, the population was 937, making it the fourth-least populous county in Montana. Its county seat is Wibaux.

History
Wibaux County was created by the Montana Legislature in 1914 from parts of Dawson, Fallon, and Richland Counties. The name comes from Pierre Wibaux (1858–1913), a late 19th-century cattle baron and friend of Theodore Roosevelt whose ranch was just over the border (in Dakota Territory, later North Dakota). According to legend, Pierre Wibaux's cowboys surrounded the town of Mingusville, and wouldn't let anyone enter or leave town unless they signed a petition changing the name of the town to Wibaux. Upon his death, his ashes were spread over a hill west of Wibaux. Today, a statue of Pierre Wibaux stands on that hill.

Geography
It is the third-smallest county in Montana by land area.

Adjacent counties

 Richland County – north
 Dawson County – northwest
 Prairie County – west
 Fallon County – south
 Golden Valley County, North Dakota – east
 McKenzie County, North Dakota – northeast

Major highways
  Interstate 94
  U.S. Highway 10 (Former)
  Montana Highway 7

National protected area
 Lamesteer National Wildlife Refuge

Demographics

2000 census
As of the 2000 census, there were 1,068 people, 421 households, and 287 families in the county. The population density was less than 1 person per square mile (1/km2). There were 587 housing units at an average density of 0.7/square mile (0.3/km2). The racial makeup of the county was 98.03% White, 0.19% Black or African American, 0.47% Native American, 0.19% Asian, 0.28% from other races, and 0.84% from two or more races. 0.37% of the population were Hispanic or Latino of any race. 32.4% were of German, 18.7% Norwegian, 13.3% Polish, 6.7% English and 6.4% Irish ancestry.

There were 421 households, out of which 29.20% had children under the age of 18 living with them, 58.20% were married couples living together, 5.90% had a female householder with no husband present, and 31.80% were non-families. 29.00% of all households were made up of individuals, and 15.90% had someone living alone who was 65 years of age or older. The average household size was 2.45 and the average family size was 3.02.

The county population contained 25.80% under the age of 18, 5.80% from 18 to 24, 22.50% from 25 to 44, 24.30% from 45 to 64, and 21.50% who were 65 years of age or older. The median age was 42 years. For every 100 females there were 92.40 males. For every 100 females age 18 and over, there were 92.20 males.

The median income for a household in the county was $28,224, and the median income for a family was $34,265. Males had a median income of $22,750 versus $18,667 for females. The per capita income for the county was $16,121.  About 8.60% of families and 15.30% of the population were below the poverty line, including 18.70% of those under age 18 and 12.60% of those age 65 or over.

2010 census
As of the 2010 census, there were 1,017 people, 457 households, and 281 families in the county. There were 538 housing units at an average density of 0.6/square mile (0.2/km2). The racial makeup of the county was 97.6% white, 0.5% Asian, 0.4% American Indian, 0.3% from other races, and 1.2% from two or more races. Those of Hispanic or Latino origin made up 1.3% of the population. In terms of ancestry, 46.3% were German, 13.7% were Polish, 13.4% were Irish, 12.1% were American, 9.5% were English, 8.0% were Norwegian, and 5.3% were Dutch.

Of the 457 households, 24.1% had children under the age of 18 living with them, 50.1% were married couples living together, 6.1% had a female householder with no husband present, 38.5% were non-families, and 35.4% of all households were made up of individuals. The average household size was 2.17 and the average family size was 2.80. The median age was 49.0 years.

The median income for a household in the county was $40,417 and the median income for a family was $51,354. Males had a median income of $43,438 versus $24,821 for females. The per capita income for the county was $22,579. About 7.2% of families and 11.8% of the population were below the poverty line, including 22.7% of those under age 18 and 12.8% of those age 65 or over.

Politics
Wibaux County voters are reliably Republican. Since 1964 they have selected the Democratic Party candidate in only one national election (as of 2020).

Communities

Town
 Wibaux (county seat)

Unincorporated communities
 Carlyle
 St. Phillip
 Yates

See also
 List of lakes in Wibaux County, Montana
 List of mountains in Wibaux County, Montana
 National Register of Historic Places listings in Wibaux County, Montana

References

 
1914 establishments in Montana
Populated places established in 1914